James Mulholland (10 April 1938 – 21 June 1994) was a Scottish footballer, who played for East Stirlingshire, Chelsea, Greenock Morton, Barrow, Stockport County and Crewe Alexandra.

References

External links

1938 births
1994 deaths
Association football inside forwards
Scottish footballers
Glasgow United F.C. players
East Stirlingshire F.C. players
Chelsea F.C. players
Greenock Morton F.C. players
Barrow A.F.C. players
Stockport County F.C. players
Crewe Alexandra F.C. players
Scottish Football League players
English Football League players
Footballers from Glasgow